Ferdinand I ( 19 April 1793 – 29 June 1875) was Emperor of Austria from March 1835 until his abdication in December 1848. He was also King of Hungary, Croatia and Bohemia (as Ferdinand V), King of Lombardy–Venetia and holder of many other lesser titles (see grand title of the Emperor of Austria). Due to his passive but well-intentioned character, he gained the sobriquet The Benign or The Benevolent (Polish: Ferdynand Dobrotliwy).

Ferdinand succeeded his father Francis I upon his death on 2 March 1835. He was incapable of ruling the empire because of a mental deficiency, so his father, before he died, made a will promulgating that Ferdinand should consult his uncle Archduke Louis on all aspects of internal policy and urged him to be influenced by Prince Metternich, Austria's Foreign Minister.

Following the Revolutions of 1848, Ferdinand abdicated on 2 December 1848. He was succeeded by his nephew, Franz Joseph. Following his abdication, he lived in Hradčany Palace, Prague, until his death in 1875.

Ferdinand married Maria Anna of Savoy, the sixth child of Victor Emmanuel I of Sardinia. They had no children.

Biography

Early life 
Ferdinand was the eldest son of Francis II, Holy Roman Emperor and Maria Theresa of Naples and Sicily. Possibly as a result of his parents' genetic closeness (they were double first cousins), Ferdinand had hydrocephalus, neurological problems including epilepsy, and a speech impediment. He was educated by Baron Josef Kalasanz von Erberg, and his wife Countess Josephine von Attems.

Reign 

Ferdinand suffered from epilepsy. Although he has been depicted as feeble-minded and incapable of ruling, he kept a coherent and legible diary and has even been said to have had a sharp wit. However, suffering as many as twenty seizures per day severely restricted his ability to rule with any effectiveness. Though he was not declared incapacitated, a Regent's Council (Archduke Louis, Count Kolowrat, and Prince Metternich) steered the government.

When Ferdinand married Princess Maria Anna of Savoy, the court physician considered it unlikely that he would be able to consummate the marriage. When he tried to consummate the marriage, he had five seizures. He is best remembered for his command to his cook: when told he could not have apricot dumplings (Marillenknödel) because apricots were out of season, he said "I am the Emperor, and I want dumplings!" (!).

1848 Revolution 

As the revolutionaries of 1848 were marching on the palace, he is supposed to have asked Metternich for an explanation. When Metternich answered that they were starting a revolution, Ferdinand is supposed to have said "But are they allowed to do that?" (Viennese German: Ja, dürfen's denn des?) He was convinced by Prince Felix of Schwarzenberg to abdicate in favour of his nephew, Franz Joseph (the next in line was Ferdinand's younger brother Franz Karl, but he was persuaded to renounce his succession rights in favour of his son) who would occupy the Austrian throne for the next 68 years.

Ferdinand recorded the events in his diary: "The affair ended with the new Emperor kneeling before his old Emperor and Lord, that is to say, me, and asking for a blessing, which I gave him, laying both hands on his head and making the sign of the Holy Cross ... then I embraced him and kissed our new master, and then we went to our room. Afterwards I and my dear wife heard Holy Mass ... After that I and my dear wife packed our bags."

In retirement (1848–1875)

Ferdinand was the last King of Bohemia to be crowned as such. Due to his sympathy with Bohemia (where he spent the rest of his life in Prague Castle) he was given the Czech nickname "Ferdinand V, the Good" (Ferdinand Dobrotivý). In Austria, Ferdinand was similarly nicknamed "Ferdinand der Gütige" (Ferdinand the Benign), but also ridiculed as "Gütinand der Fertige" (Goodinand the Finished).

Ferdinand was also the last ruler to be crowned with the Iron Crown of Lombardy in his capacity as King of Lombardy-Venetia.

He is interred in tomb number 62 in the Imperial Crypt in Vienna.

Titles and honours 
He used the titles:

His Imperial and Royal Apostolic Majesty Ferdinand the First, By the Grace of God
 Emperor of Austria, King of Hungary, Bohemia, fifth by this name, King of Lombardy and Venice, King of Dalmatia, Croatia, Slavonia, Galicia, Lodomeria, and Illyria;
 King of Jerusalem etc.
 Archduke of Austria
 Grand duke of Tuscany and Cracow [from 1846];
 Duke of Lorraine, Salzburg, Styria, Carinthia and Carniola, Upper and Lower Silesia, of Modena, Parma, Piacenza and Guastalla, of Auschwitz and Zator, of Teschen, Friuli, Ragusa, and Zara;
 Grand prince of Transylvania;
 Margrave of Moravia;
 Princely Count of Habsburg, Kyburg, Tyrol, Gorizia and Gradisca;
 Prince of Trent and Brixen;
 Margrave of Upper and Lower Lusatia and in Istria, Count of Hohenems, Feldkirch, Bregenz, Sonnenberg, etc.
 Lord of Trieste, Cattaro and over the Windic March.

Honours

Ancestry 

Ferdinand's parents were double first cousins as they shared all four grandparents (Francis' paternal grandparents were his wife's maternal grandparents and vice versa). Therefore, Ferdinand only had four great-grandparents, being descended from each of them twice. Further back in his ancestry there is more pedigree collapse due to the close intermarriage between the Houses of Austria and Spain and other Catholic monarchies.

See also 
 Charles II of Spain (1661–1700)
 List of heirs to the Austrian throne
 Rulers of Germany family tree. He was related to every other ruler of Germany.

References

External links 

 Tomáš Kleisner, "Medals of the Emperor Ferdinand the Good 1793-1875" Prague 2013 
 "Biography of Emperor Ferdinand" 
 
 
 Ferdinand I In: 
 Ferdinand I In: 
 
 

 
Ferdinand of Austria
Ferdinand of Austria
19th-century Emperors of Austria
Dukes of Opole
Monarchs who abdicated
House of Habsburg-Lorraine
Ferdinand of Austria
Grand Masters of the Order of the Golden Fleece
Knights of the Golden Fleece of Austria
Recipients of the Military Order of Maria Theresa
Grand Crosses of the Order of Saint Stephen of Hungary
Grand Crosses of the Order of Christ (Portugal)
People with epilepsy
People with hydrocephalus
Royalty and nobility with disabilities
19th-century Archdukes of Austria
Burials at the Imperial Crypt
Burials at St. Stephen's Cathedral, Vienna
Dukes of Carniola
Sons of emperors
Children of Francis II, Holy Roman Emperor